Peter of Goulaion was a Byzantine abbot of the early 9th century, who was used by Emperor Nikephoros I as envoy.

He was abbot (hegumenos) of the monastery of Goulaion, whose exact location and identity are not known. He is commonly identified with the Petrus abbas who was one of the leaders (along with Michahel episcopus, identified with Michael of Synnada) of an embassy sent by Nikephoros I to Charlemagne in 802/3. In 806, during the invasion of Asia Minor by the Abbasid caliph Harun al-Rashid, Peter and Michael, along with Gregory, the steward of Amastris, were sent to the Caliph to propose negotiate a peace.

References

Sources
 
 

9th-century Byzantine monks
Byzantine diplomats
Byzantine Iconoclasm
Year of birth unknown
Byzantine people of the Arab–Byzantine wars
Ambassadors of the Byzantine Empire to the Abbasid Caliphate
Byzantine Empire–Carolingian Empire relations
9th-century diplomats